Zhu Changying (25 April 1597 – 21 December 1645), formally known as Prince Duan of Gui, was a prince of the Ming dynasty and the seventh son of the Wanli Emperor. He was the father of the Yongli Emperor, the last Southern Ming emperor.

After his son became emperor, he was posthumously honoured as Emperor Duan (端皇帝), with the temple name of Lizong (禮宗).

Family 
Consorts and Issue:
 Empress Xiaoqinduan, of the Lü clan (孝欽端皇后 呂氏)
 Empress Xiaozheng, of the Wang clan (孝正皇太后 王氏; d.1651), catholic name Helena
 Empress Dowager Zhaosheng, of the Ma clan (昭聖太后 馬氏; 1578–1669)
 Zhu Youlang, the Yongli Emperor (永历帝 朱由榔; 1623–1662), fourth son
 Unknown
 Zhu You? (朱由?), first son
 Zhu You?, Prince Min of Gui (桂閔王 朱由?), second son
 Zhu You'ai, Prince Gong of Gui (桂恭王 朱由𣜬; 1623–1646), third son
 Zhu Youzhan, Prince of Yongxing (永興王 朱由榐), fifth son
 Zhu You?, Prince of Xintian (新田王 朱由?), sixth son
 Zhu You?, Prince of Jianghua (江華王 朱由?), seventh son
 Zhu Yourong, Prince of Jiashan (嘉善王 朱由榮), eighth son
 Princess Anhua (安化公主)
 Second daughter (9 March 1626 – 20 March 1627)
 Princess Guangde (廣德公主)

References 

1597 births
1645 deaths
Ming dynasty imperial princes
Sons of emperors